Spider-Man/Deadpool is a 50 issue comic book series published by Marvel Comics beginning in 2016. The title characters, Spider-Man and Deadpool, shared the focus of the book. The comic was originally launched by Joe Kelly and Ed McGuinness, but many authors and artists worked on the series during its run. Spider-Man/Deadpool is an action-comedy that explores the dynamic between the two characters and their personality differences.

Summary 
The comic focuses on Deadpool and Spider-Man as they team up to face various threats. While Deadpool is immensely pleased as he finally gets to hang out with his favorite wall-crawler, Spider-Man is initially all too disgusted with Deadpool, having previously quit the Avengers Unity Squad because Deadpool became a member. As they team up and hang out together, Spidey learns about the man behind the wisecracking mercenary, while Deadpool starts holding himself to a higher moral standard in order to get closer to Spidey. It's not all bromance and sunshine, however, as Deadpool has been hired to kill Peter Parker.

Things only get more complicated from there, as several foes from both beyond the grave and the very living realm serve to give these two a hard time, testing the mettle their (often contrasting) morals are made of.

Ultimately, this series is an exploration of the characters. "Drilling down on their friendship was our goal from the first issue. When we started, they were even more at odds due to the events of Secret Empire. That allowed us to have them wind up in situations where they were forced to find common ground," said Robbie Thomson on the subject of the character's relationship. "I think with Wade, he’s an anti-hero, but there’s a true blue hero somewhere deep down inside, under all the toilet humor and murder and lack of boundaries. And he views Spider-Man as the gold standard of being a good guy. He admires him. And who can blame him? For Spider-Man, one thing that I love about him is that he has the ability to see the potential good in anyone. Even when it costs him. So, he knows Wade is foolish and goes too far, but he also has seen Wade be heroic, as well as save Spider-Man from time to time. And yet, Wade can always snatch defeat from the claws of victory on his path to redemption."

Collected editions
 Spider-Man/Deadpool by Joe Kelly & Ed McGuinness Hardcover Edition (collects Spider-Man/Deadpool #1-5, 8-10, 13-14, 17-18,  264 pages, March 20 2018)

Volume 1: Isn't it Bromantic (collects Spider-Man/Deadpool #1-5, 8 136 pages, September 13, 2016)
Volume 2: Side Pieces (collects Spider-Man/Deadpool #6-7, 11-12 and #1.MU, 120 pages, June 20, 2017)
Volume 3: Itsy Bitsy (collects Spider-Man/Deadpool #9-10, 13-14, 17-18, 136 pages, October 3, 2017)
Volume 4: Serious Business (collects Spider-Man/Deadpool #19-22, 112 pages, January 16, 2018)
Volume 5: Arms Race (collects Spider-Man/Deadpool #23-28, 112 pages, April 24, 2018)
Volume 6: WLMD (collects Spider-Man/Deadpool #29-33, 136 pages, July 31, 2018)
Volume 7: My Two Dads (collects Spider-Man/Deadpool #34-39, 136 pages, December 11, 2018)
Volume 8: Road Trip (collects Spider-Man/Deadpool #40-45, 136 pages, April 23, 2019)
Volume 9: Eventpool (collects Spider-Man/Deadpool #46-50, 112 pages, July 23, 2019)

References 

Spider-Man titles
Deadpool titles